The 2017 Metro Atlantic Athletic Conference men's basketball tournament was the postseason men's basketball tournament for the Metro Atlantic Athletic Conference for the 2016–17 NCAA Division I men's basketball season. It was held from March 2–6, 2017 at the Times Union Center in Albany, New York. No. 3 seed Iona defeated No. 4 seed Siena 87–86 in overtime in the tournament championship game. As a result, Iona received the conference's automatic bid to the NCAA tournament. The championship marked Iona's 10th MAAC title, the most in MAAC Tournament history, and the second consecutive MAAC Tournament championship for the Gaels. It was also the fifth consecutive championship game for Iona, which is a MAAC record.

Seeds
All 11 teams in the conference participated in the Tournament. The top five teams received byes to the quarterfinals. Teams were seeded by record within the conference, with a tiebreaker system to seed teams with identical conference records.

Schedule

Bracket
Source

All-Championship Team

See also
 2017 MAAC women's basketball tournament

References

MAAC men's basketball tournament
2016–17 Metro Atlantic Athletic Conference men's basketball season
Basketball competitions in Albany, New York
MAAC men's basketball tournament
MAAC men's basketball tournament
College basketball tournaments in New York (state)